The Honourable Ronald Ian Cheffins (born in 1930; PhD; retired) is a professor emeritus of political science and law and the University of Victoria. He was the first lawyer to be appointed directly to the British Columbia court of appeal in 1985. He held the seat until resigning 2 years later in 1987 to return to legal and scholarly practice after finding judicial work too "uncongenial". In 1991 he served as the Vice-Chair on the Law Reform Commission of British Columbia. He is an expert on the Canadian Constitution and has advised five past lieutenants-governor. He is a weekly Friday guest on CFAX 1070's Adam Stirling show, where he discusses both local and world politics.

20th century 
In 1953, Cheffins was appointed as a Special Commissioner for taking Affidavits within the province of British Columbia by Lieutenant-Governor Clarence Wallace. In 1955, Cheffins graduated from the University of British Columbia with a Bachelor of Laws, before continuing his studies at the university.

Publications 
Cheffins authored The Royal Prerogative and the Office of the Lieutenant Governor in 2000, a paper which has been used as a reference in multiple additional papers and books.

Further reading
The Supreme Court of Canada: The Quiet Court in an Unquiet Country

References

1930 births
Living people
Lawyers in British Columbia
University of Victoria Faculty of Law alumni
British Columbia law
Judges in British Columbia
Peter A. Allard School of Law alumni